Xu Jilin (born 1957) is a Chinese historian. He is a professor of history at East China Normal University, and specializes in 20th century Chinese intellectual history.

Early life 
Born in 1957 in Shanghai, Xu Jilin dropped out of school and became a librarian because of the Cultural Revolution. As time passed, he eventually decided to pursue further education after passing National Higher Education Entrance Examination. He studied policy at East China Normal University.

Career 
In 1982 Xu graduated with a Bachelor's degree. He became a university lecturer. From 1997 to 2003, Xu Jilin traveled to three universities as a visiting professor and visiting scholar: the Harvard–Yenching Institute, the National University of Singapore, and the University of Tokyo. In 2003, he returned to the East China Normal University where he continued his career.

Xu Jilin serves on the editorial board of the journal Twenty-First Century Bimonthly, published by Chinese University of Hong Kong.

Views 
Xu is a liberal who disavows what he terms the political extremes. He believes in "small government, big society", and has criticised leftist models of future economic development in China, as well as the broader intellectual current of the Chinese New Left.

Selected works in English

References 

Living people
1957 births
Educators from Shanghai
Academic staff of the East China Normal University
People's Republic of China historians
Historians from Shanghai
21st-century Chinese historians
Liberalism in China